The 2016–17 season is the 97th season in Levante UD ’s history and the 43rd in the second-tier.

Squad

Competitions

Overall

Liga

League table

Matches

Kickoff times are in CET.

Copa del Rey

References

Levante UD seasons
Levante UD